The Man in the Cellar (German: Der Mann im Keller) is a 1914 German silent thriller film directed by Joe May and starring Ernst Reicher, Max Landa and Olga Engl. It was part of a series of films featuring the fictional detective Stuart Webbs.

The film's sets were designed by the art director Paul Leni.

Cast
 Ernst Reicher as Stuart Webbs 
 Max Landa as Lord Thomas Rawson 
 Olga Engl as Baronin de Lille 
 Alice Hechy as Lady Grace 
 Gerhard Dammann as Luny 
 Eduard Rothauser
 Josef Schelepa

References

Bibliography
 Ken Wlaschin. Silent Mystery and Detective Movies: A Comprehensive Filmography. McFarland, 2009.

External links

1914 films
Films of the German Empire
Films directed by Joe May
German silent feature films
German thriller films
German black-and-white films
1910s thriller films
Silent thriller films
1910s German films